The Jewish Community in Chernivtsi was the largest Jewish Community in all of Bukovina, in what is now Romania and Ukraine. At its peak in 1941, more than 45 thousand Jews lived in Chernivtsi.

The first documentation of Jews in Chernivtsi (then  in Romanian) comes from the year 1408, when Alexander I of Moldavia allowed Jews to trade in the city.  In 1498, Moldavia became a Satellite state of the Ottoman Empire. Under the Moldavian-Ottoman rule, the life of the Jews in the area knew many changes, for good and for bad.

In 1774, the Habsburg monarchy took Chernivtsi from its previous Moldavian owners. The new Habsburg rulers imposed many limits upon the Jews, such as high taxes, banning marriages and building new houses. Their aim was to "Germanize" the new area of their empire, and thus suppressing the immigration of Galician Jews to Chernivtsi. However, when the Jews of the Habsburg monarchy received emancipation in 1849 their lives became much better. Some Jews, living in the city, have been elected to serve as mayors and as members of the Imperial Council. The emancipation led the rich Jews of Chernivtsi to adopt the surrounding German culture. For example, many started speaking German. However, the poor Jews continued to speak Yiddish.

In 1918, right at the end of World War I, the Kingdom of Romania annexed Chernivtsi. A new policy called "Romanianization" was imposed. Due to that policy, many Jews working in the public service, including schools and universities, were fired. However, the Jewish community continued to flourish. New youth movements and football teams were established, new newspapers were published, and there was also even a school teaching in Hebrew.

In 1940, the Soviet Union occupied Chernivtsi. The Soviets immediately began persecuting Zionist activities and wealthy Jewish people, many of whom were deported to Siberia. In 1941, in the beginning of Operation Barbarossa, the city was retaken by Romania, which had become an ally of Nazi Germany. As a part of The Holocaust, the Jews of the city were put in a ghetto. From there, the Jews were deported to slavery camps in the Transnistria Governorate of Romania. The mayor of Chernivtsi at the time, Traian Popovici, opposed the harsh policy against the Jews. He allowed 15 thousand Jews to escape the departure to Transnistria, claiming they were important for the city's economy. For his deeds Popovici received the title of Righteous Among the Nations. After World War II ended in 1945, many Jews returning from Transnistria left Chernivtsi in order to live in other countries. They were replaced by other Jews, who came from all over the Soviet Union. In 2001, only 1,400 Jews lived in Chernivtsi, most of whom are the descendants of the Jewish immigrants after World War II.

References

Chernivtsi
Chernivtsi